Estadio La Independencia (Spanish for The Independence Stadium) is a multi-use stadium in the city of Tunja, Colombia. It is currently used mostly for football matches. The stadium has a capacity of 25,000 people, and is 2,800 metres above sea level. Boyacá Chicó and Patriotas play their home games at this stadium.

Before Boyaca Chico's 2008 Apertura league title in June 2008, the stadium's capacity was 8,000, but for the final the capacity was temporarily expanded to 12,000. Also with Chico's qualification to 2009 Copa Libertadores, the stadium was due to be expanded, in order to achieve the minimum 20000 seats that CONMEBOL requires to host an international match. The expansion work started in December 2008, with a total cost of 26 million COP. Despite this, the renovations were completed for the first Chicó match at La Independencia, against Brazil's Gremio in the Copa Libertadores.

Since the beginning of 2017, improvements have been made due to the participation of Patriotas Boyaca. in the 2017 Copa Sudamericana. The stadium has been the main venue for musical and cultural events, including concerts of international singers such as Marc Anthony, Alejandro Fernández, among others.

References

External links 
World Stadiums; La Independencia
Cuenta oficial de twitter de Patriotas F.C.
Instituto de deportes de Boyacá

La Independencia
Buildings and structures in Boyacá Department
Buildings and structures in Tunja
Boyacá Chicó F.C.